Centerville is a city in Anoka County, Minnesota, United States. The population was 3,792 at the 2010 census.

Geography

Main Street / County Road 14 serves as a main route in the community. Interstate 35E is nearby.

Centerville is completely surrounded by the city of Lino Lakes.

History
Centerville was established in 1857. It was named for its location in relation to Saint Paul, the Mississippi River at Anoka, and the Saint Croix River at Stillwater.

Education
Centerville is served by Independent School District #12, the Centennial School District. Students attend Centerville Elementary School from kindergarten to 5th grade, Centennial Middle School in Lino Lakes from sixth to eighth grade, and Centennial High School in nearby Circle Pines from ninth to 12th grade.

Demographics

2010 census
As of the census of 2010, there were 3,792 people, 1,315 households, and 1,025 families living in the city. The racial makeup of the city was 94.3% White, 0.3% African American, 0.4% Native American, 2.7% Asian, 0.4% from other races, and 1.8% from two or more races. Hispanic or Latino of any race were 1.6% of the population.

There were 1,315 households, of which 46.6% had children under the age of 18 living with them, 67.8% were married couples living together, 5.9% had a female householder with no husband present, 4.3% had a male householder with no wife present, and 22.1% were non-families. 17.6% of all households were made up of individuals, and 5.6% had someone living alone who was 65 years of age or older. The average household size was 2.88 and the average family size was 3.28.

The median age in the city was 35.8 years. 30.8% of residents were under the age of 18; 6% were between the ages of 18 and 24; 29.9% were from 25 to 44; 25.9% were from 45 to 64; and 7.4% were 65 years of age or older. The gender makeup of the city was 50.8% male and 49.2% female.

2000 census
As of the census of 2000, there were 3,206 people, 1,078 households, and 879 families living in the city. There were 1,094 housing units at an average density of   The racial makeup of the city was 96.72% White, 0.25% African American, 0.44% Native American, 0.72% Asian, 0.37% from other races, and 1.50% from two or more races. Hispanic or Latino of any race were 1.44% of the population.

There were 1,078 households, out of which 50.3% had children under the age of 18 living with them, 72.8% were married couples living together, 5.9% had a female householder with no husband present, and 18.4% were non-families. 13.6% of all households were made up of individuals, and 1.8% had someone living alone who was 65 years of age or older.  The average household size was 2.97 and the average family size was 3.28.

In the city, the population was spread out, with 33.6% under the age of 18, 5.1% from 18 to 24, 42.8% from 25 to 44, 15.2% from 45 to 64, and 3.3% who were 65 years of age or older. The median age was 31 years. For every 100 females, there were 105.9 males. For every 100 females age 18 and over, there were 104.3 males.

The median income for a household in the city was $63,696, and the median income for a family was $67,336. Males had a median income of $42,371 versus $31,474 for females. The per capita income for the city was $23,113. About 0.6% of families and 2.4% of the population were below the poverty line, including 0.7% of those under age 18 and none of those age 65 or over.

Notable person
 Tracie Joy McBride, soldier and murder victim

References

External links
 Centerville, MN – Official Website

Cities in Anoka County, Minnesota
Cities in Minnesota
Populated places established in 1857
1857 establishments in Minnesota Territory